JSP may refer to:

Computing
Jackson structured programming
JavaServer Pages, server-side Java
Java stored procedure (SQL/JRT)

Organisations
The Japanese School in Perth
Jewish Settlement Police, an organization established in Mandatory Palestine in 1936
JSP Records, a record label

Politics
Japan Socialist Party, a political party existed from 1945 to 1996 in Japan 
Jai Samaikyandhra Party, a political party in India
Jana Sena Party, a political party in India

Other uses
Japanese Surrendered Personnel
Jacketed, soft point, a soft-point bullet
Jesup station (Amtrak station code), a train station in Georgia, US
Joint Service Publication, a UK MoD document
The Joseph Smith Papers, the published volumes of all of Joseph Smith's writings
Joseph Smith Papyri, Egyptian papyrus fragments